Winter is the 14th studio album by British rock band New Model Army, released on 26 August 2016 by Attack Attack Records in the United Kingdom and by EarMUSIC worldwide. It was named the number-one album of 2016 by The Big Takeover.

Reception

Winter received mixed to positive reviews from critics. On Metacritic, the album holds a score of 65/100 based on 5 reviews, indicating "generally favourable reviews".

Track listing
All tracks written by New Model Army.
"Beginning" – 7:00
"Burn the Castle" – 3:12
"Winter" – 4:20
"Part the Waters" – 4:26
"Eyes Get Used to the Darkness" – 4:40
"Drifts" – 4:26
"Born Feral" – 6:25
"Die Trying" – 3:35
"Devil" – 4:33
"Strogoula" – 4:11
"Echo November" – 3:00
"Weak and Strong" – 4:12
"After Something" – 4:00

Personnel

New Model Army
Justin Sullivan – vocals, guitar, keyboards, harmonica
Ceri Monger – bass, percussion, dulcimer, backing vocals
Michael Dean – drums, percussion, backing vocals
Dean White – keyboards, guitar, backing vocals, percussion
Marshall Gill – guitar, percussion, backing vocals

Production
Justin Sullivan – production, recording

Charts

References

External links
Official NMA website

New Model Army (band) albums
2016 albums